Rawnsley is an area of Cannock Chase District, Staffordshire, England. It is located between Hazelslade and Prospect Village. Rawnsley is a former mining hamlet and was served by the mineral line from Hednesford to Burntwood which carried minerals to the mines around the area. There is traces of the former line near modern-day Rawnsley. Mostly on Littleworth Road.

Transportation 
The area is served by the 62 Lichfield–Cannock bus route.

References

 
 
 
 

Populated places in Staffordshire
Unparished areas in Staffordshire
Cannock Chase District